The Forum for East Asia-Latin America Cooperation or (abbreviated as FEALAC) is a regional forum of 36 countries constituting the region of East, Southeast Asia and Latin America that came together to form an official and regular dialogue channel between the two regions.

History

East Asia and Latin America are both composed of developing countries and are economically dynamic and complementary to each other.  They follow the global trend of regional cooperation; the need for intercontinental cooperation between East Asia and Latin America arose because there was no official cooperative mechanism bridging the two regions. In 1998, a concrete proposal to enhance the relations of the two regions was initiated by the former Singaporean Prime Minister Goh Chok Tong. Subsequently, the East Asia-Latin America Forum Senior Officials meeting was held in Singapore in 1998, marking the beginning of the organization.

References

External links
 Official website

Organizations established in 1999
Supranational unions
Supraorganizations
International organizations based in Asia
1999 establishments in South Korea